Duane Paul Ludwig (born August 4, 1978) is an American mixed martial arts coach, retired professional kickboxer and mixed martial artist.

Ludwig formerly held the unofficial fastest knockout record in the UFC after his win against Jonathan Goulet (in 0:06)  at UFC Fight Night 3. Ludwig was regarded as a top lightweight in the world during 2003 and 2004, for his victories over Jens Pulver at UCC 12 and Genki Sudo at UFC 42, up until a loss to B.J. Penn at K-1 MMA: Romanex. Ludwig has also received acclaim for his role in the success of Team Alpha Male operating out of Sacramento, California, which is home to numerous highly ranked mixed martial artists who have competed in organizations such as the Ultimate Fighting Championship and World Extreme Cagefighting.

Kickboxing career

Duane started practicing Muay Thai when he was 15 years old.  He would have a successful amateur career winning twelve of his fourteen bouts and picking up three IKF International Kickboxing Federation Muay Thai national and regional titles.  He turned professional in 2000 when he defeated Terrance Jones at a Ring of Fire event, in what was a rematch from their amateur days. At the end of the year Duane won his first pro title by winning the W.K.A. US national title, which he followed with the I.M.T.C. title the next year.   
He had his first real challenge in 2001 when he faced world champion Alex Gong for his I.S.K.A. belt at a K-1 event in Las Vegas.  The title went the distance with the young Ludwig suffering his first professional defeat.  There was some controversy about the decision as some thought that despite a shaky start Ludwig had shaded it.

In 2002 Duane dropped down in weight to 70 kg to take part in a qualifying tournament for the first ever K-1 MAX world final.  He won the four man tournament, defeating no. 1 ranked I.K.F. fighter Ole Laursen in the final to book his place to Tokyo.  At the finals Ludwig was drawn against home favourite Masato, and despite his best efforts was unable to make the semi finals, being outclassed by the local fighter over three rounds to lose by unanimous decision.  He would get another shot at K-1 MAX glory the following year in Saitama, Japan and went one better, reaching the semi finals where he lost to 2002 K-1 MAX champion Albert Kraus.  In 2004 he won his last Muay Thai title where he finally got his hands on a world title, defeating Thai superstar Malaipet by decision after five rounds to win the I.S.K.A. world title, something Ludwig considers one of his proudest ever moments.  The title fight was also notable as the belt had previously been held by Alex Gong - a rematch between him and Ludwig had been on the card since their bout in 2001 but Gong died in 2003.  After this victory Duane would become increasingly involved in MMA at the expense of his Kickboxing career, although he would have a number of K-1 fights up until 2006, finishing with a 4-7-1 record with the organization.

Mixed martial arts career
Ludwig was trained by Bas Rutten during his early career. Although not an official title match, Ludwig nonetheless beat Jens Pulver, who was at the time ranked as the #1 Lightweight mixed martial artist in the world by many outlets, by first round K.O.

UFC

At UFC 42, Duane Ludwig fought Genki Sudo. Sudo showed his theatrical side, walking backwards towards Ludwig and doing the robot dance before taking him down. Despite the initial domination by Sudo, Ludwig started inflicting damage while standing, avoiding a rolling kneebar and several takedown attempts. Whilst it seemed the momentum had shifted in Ludwig's favor, Sudo came back in the third round and took him down, pounding and bloodying him with punches and elbows. Whilst Ludwig was taking a beating, referee John McCarthy interrupted and stood the two fighters up to check on Ludwig's nose. When the doctor allowed the fight to resume they did not restart from the same previous dominant position held by Sudo. Ludwig took advantage of the indirect rest given to him and avoided, with the aid of the referee's decision, the unfavorable position that he was in. He dominated the end of the fight landing hurtful shots on Sudo to win a split decision. Ludwig mocked Sudo after the final bell with a crane kick pose.

Notorious fast knockout 

At UFC Fight Night 3, Ludwig faced Jonathan Goulet. Ludwig won the fight via quick knockout, though many fans disagreed with the timekeeping of the finish, which was 11 seconds despite the referee pulling Ludwig away from Goulet at around the 6 second mark. Following multiple online campaigns to overturn the timekeeping error, on Christmas Eve 2011, UFC President Dana White informed Ludwig that he was being given the official fastest knockout time. Two days later, Keith Kizer and the Nevada State Athletic Commission denied that Ludwig would be given the record, with Kizer stating: "There's no legal avenue to overturn it" before going on to say "I timed it myself with a stopwatch. It was eight seconds. Officially, it's got to stay at 11 seconds, but unofficially, it could be at eight." Two days later, Dana White, along with his production crew posted a video to YouTube showing the times of UFC fights that hold the "Fastest Knockout" tag. Ludwig's knockout was timed at 6.06 seconds, compared to Chan Sung Jung's knockout at 6.26 seconds and Todd Duffee's knockout at 7.56 seconds.

In 2019, Jorge Masvidal beat Ludwig's time with a knockout in five seconds.

Return To UFC
On December 17, it was announced that Ludwig was set to return to the UFC at UFC 108, facing Jim Miller, replacing an injured Sean Sherk. He lost to Miller via armbar in the first round.

Ludwig was scheduled to face Spencer Fisher on March 21, 2010, at UFC LIVE: Vera vs. Jones, but Fisher was forced off the card with an injury.  Ludwig instead faced UFC newcomer Darren Elkins.  Ludwig lost via TKO after he suffered a serious ankle injury during the first round.

Ludwig moved up to the Welterweight Division to face Nick Osipczak on November 13, 2010, at UFC 122. The fight was supposed to be on the preliminary part of the event, but a last minute illness to main card fighter Alessio Sakara moved the bout to the main card. Ludwig scored with strikes, including multiple grazing headkicks in the first round until Osipczak landed a combination, buckling the veteran. The round ended with Osipczak landing ground and pound from the top, bloodying Ludwig. The second round was pretty even with mixed striking exchanges and takedown attempts. The third round saw Ludwig land a big left early on and basically stalk Osipczak the rest of the round, scoring but failing to finish as Osipczak was seemingly out on his feet, walking away from exchanges and covering up. The bout was Ludwig's first since an eight-month recovery from a severe leg injury. Ludwig won by split decision.

Ludwig was expected to face Amir Sadollah on March 26, 2011, at UFC Fight Night 24, but was unable to fight due to a sternum injury.  James Wilks took his place in the match instead.

Ludwig vs. Sadollah eventually took place on August 14, 2011, at UFC on Versus 5. Ludwig won the fight via unanimous decision (29-28, 29-28, 29-28). Ludwig outstruck and rocked Sadollah in both the first and second rounds while also showing greatly improved takedown defense throughout the fight.

Ludwig next faced Josh Neer on January 20, 2012, at UFC on FX: Guillard vs. Miller.  Despite hurting Neer on several occasions via punches, Ludwig lost the fight via technical submission in the first round.

Ludwig fought Dan Hardy on May 26, 2012, at UFC 146. Ludwig suffered a knockout loss to Hardy when he was hit by a flush left hook and followed up elbows.

Ludwig faced Che Mills on September 29, 2012, at UFC on Fuel TV 5.  The bout was stopped after Ludwig was unable to continue after tearing a knee ligament while attempting to defend a takedown in the opening round.

After his loss to Mills, Ludwig retired from MMA competition.

From December 2012 to May 2014, Ludwig was the head coach at Team Alpha Male. Ludwig left Team Alpha Male after UFC 173 to focus on growing his own gym, BANG Muay Thai.

Personal life
Ludwig and his wife Jessica have three children; one daughter Jade, a son named Duane Jr., on November 10, 2010, and a son named Carter Bas Ludwig born in 2013.  Before becoming a professional fighter, Ludwig used to work as an electrician.

Before his move to Colorado, Ludwig previously served as the camp's head coach, where his impact was believed to have had the "missing link" in elevating the team as one of the gold standards for training camps in the world. Ludwig has been voted the Coach of the Year in 2013 and 2014.  Ludwig was considered the key element in helping Team Alpha Male win Gym of the Year in 2013 by the World MMA Awards.

 BANG Muay Thai Martial Arts System 

Ludwig created BANG Muay Thai system (or BMT) which is a Muay Thai system. The philosophy draws upon experience from Ludwig's career and coaches such as Bas Rutten and Trevor Wittman.  The system is a striking style which includes Muay Thai, Dutch kickboxing, American boxing and traditional martial arts. Approximately 40 schools teach BMT. 

In October 2010, Ludwig opened his own Mixed Martial Arts Academy known as "Ludwig Martial Arts" where he trains fighters such as former UFC Bantamweight Champion TJ Dillashaw and perennial UFC Flyweight contender Joseph Benavidez as well as several others.

Championships and accomplishments

Mixed martial arts
TKO Major League MMA
2003 U.C.C. World Lightweight Champion
Extreme Shoot Fighting
2000 Extreme Shoot Fighting Lightweight Champion
Sherdog Awards
Fighter of the Year Honorable Mention (2003)
Fight of the Year Honorable Mention (2003) vs. Genki Sudo at UFC 42
World MMA Awards
The "Shawn Tompkins" Coach of the Year Award (2013)
The "Shawn Tompkins" Coach of the Year Award (2014)
Gym of the Year (2013)
Yahoo! Sports
Trainer of the Year (2013)

Kickboxing
K-1
K-1 2002 World MAX USA Champion -70 kg
International Sport Karate Association
I.S.K.A. 2004 Muay Thai Light Middleweight World Champion -72.5 kg
World Kickboxing Association
W.K.A. 2000 Muay Thai Super Middleweight USA title -76 kg
International Kickboxing Federation
IKF 1999 Muay Thai Light Middleweight U.S Amateur Tournament Champion -72.5 kg
IKF 1999 Muay Thai Super Middleweight U.S Amateur Champion -78 kg
IKF 1999 Regional Middleweight Muay Thai Champion
IKF 1999 Fighter of the Year
International Muay Thai Council
I.M.T.C. 2001 Muay Thai Super Middleweight North American Champion -76 kg

Mixed martial arts record

|-
| Loss
| align=center| 21–14
| Che Mills
| TKO (knee injury)
| UFC on Fuel TV: Struve vs. Miocic
| 
| align=center| 1
| align=center| 2:28
| Nottingham, England
| 
|-
| Loss
| align=center| 21–13
| Dan Hardy
| KO (punch and elbows)
| UFC 146
| 
| align=center| 1
| align=center| 3:51
| Las Vegas, Nevada, United States
| 
|-
| Loss
| align=center| 21–12
| Josh Neer
| Technical Submission (guillotine choke)
| UFC on FX: Guillard vs. Miller
| 
| align=center| 1
| align=center| 3:04
| Nashville, Tennessee, United States
| 
|-
| Win
| align=center| 21–11
| Amir Sadollah
| Decision (unanimous)
| UFC Live: Hardy vs. Lytle
| 
| align=center| 3
| align=center| 5:00
| Milwaukee, Wisconsin, United States
| 
|-
| Win
| align=center| 20–11
| Nick Osipczak
| Decision (split)
| UFC 122
| 
| align=center| 3
| align=center| 5:00
| Oberhausen, Germany
| 
|-
| Loss
| align=center| 19–11
| Darren Elkins
| TKO (ankle injury)
| UFC Live: Vera vs. Jones
| 
| align=center| 1
| align=center| 0:44
| Broomfield, Colorado, United States
| 
|-
| Loss
| align=center| 19–10
| Jim Miller
| Submission (armbar)
| UFC 108
| 
| align=center| 1
| align=center| 2:31
| Las Vegas, Nevada, United States
| 
|-
| Win
| align=center| 19–9
| Ryan Roberts
| TKO (submission to punches)
| ROF 36: Demolition
| 
| align=center| 1
| align=center| 2:05
| Denver, Colorado, United States
| 
|-
| Loss
| align=center| 18–9
| Lyle Beerbohm
| Submission (bulldog choke)
| Strikeforce Challengers: Villasenor vs. Cyborg
| 
| align=center| 1
| align=center| 4:27
| Kent, Washington, United States
| 
|-
| Win
| align=center| 18–8
| Yves Edwards
| Decision (unanimous)
| Strikeforce: Destruction
| 
| align=center| 3
| align=center| 5:00
| San Jose, California, United States
| 
|-
| Win
| align=center| 17–8
| Sammy Morgan
| TKO (punches)
| Strikeforce: Payback
| 
| align=center| 1
| align=center| 2:01
| Broomfield, Colorado, United States
| 
|-
| Loss
| align=center| 16–8
| Takanori Gomi
| TKO (doctor stoppage)
| World Victory Road Presents: Sengoku First Battle
| 
| align=center| 1
| align=center| 2:28
| Tokyo, Japan
| 
|-
| Win
| align=center| 16–7
| Mario Stapel
| KO (punch)
| ROF 30: Domination
| 
| align=center| 1
| align=center| 1:50
| Broomfield, Colorado, United States
| 
|-
| Loss
| align=center| 15–7
| Paul Daley
| TKO (punches)
| Strikeforce: Shamrock vs. Baroni
| 
| align=center| 2
| align=center| 0:42
| San Jose, California, United States
| 
|-
| Win
| align=center| 15–6
| Shinya Kumazawa
| Technical Submission (arm-triangle choke)
| ROF 28: Evolution
| 
| align=center| 2
| align=center| 4:32
| Broomfield, Colorado, United States
| 
|-
| Win
| align=center| 14–6
| Tony Fryklund
| TKO (knees)
| Strikeforce: Triple Threat
| 
| align=center| 2
| align=center| 3:37
| San Jose, California, United States
| Welterweight bout
|-
| Loss
| align=center| 13–6
| Josh Thomson
| Submission (guillotine choke)
| Strikeforce: Tank vs. Buentello
| 
| align=center| 2
| align=center| 4:36
| Fresno, California, United States
| 
|-
| Loss
| align=center| 13–5
| Tyson Griffin
| TKO (punches)
| Strikeforce: Revenge
| 
| align=center| 1
| align=center| 3:57
| San Jose, California, United States
| 
|-
| Win
| align=center| 13–4
| Jason Palacios
| Submission (armbar)
| International Freestyle Fighting 1
| 
| align=center| 1
| align=center| 4:56
| Fort Worth, Texas, United States
| 
|-
| Win
| align=center| 12–4
| Toshikatsu Harada
| KO (punches)
| ROF 21: Full Blast
| 
| align=center| 1
| align=center| 1:44
| Castle Rock, Colorado, United States
| 
|-
| Win
| align=center| 11–4
| Jonathan Goulet
| KO (punch)
| UFC Fight Night 3
| 
| align=center| 1
| align=center| 0:11
| Las Vegas, Nevada, United States
|
|-
| Loss
| align=center| 10–4
| Sammy Morgan
| KO (punches)
| Ring of Fire 16
| 
| align=center| 1
| align=center| 0:52
| Denver, Colorado, United States
| 
|-
| Loss
| align=center| 10–3
| B.J. Penn
| Submission (arm-triangle choke)
| K-1 MMA: Romanex
| 
| align=center| 1
| align=center| 1:45
| Saitama, Saitama, Japan
| 
|-
| Win
| align=center| 10–2
| Genki Sudo
| Decision (split)
| UFC 42
| 
| align=center| 3
| align=center| 5:00
| Miami, Florida, United States
| 
|-
| Win
| align=center| 9–2
| Jens Pulver
| TKO (punch)
| UCC 12: Adrenaline
| 
| align=center| 1
| align=center| 1:03
| Montreal, Quebec, Canada
| 
|-
| Win
| align=center| 8–2
| Thomas Denny
| TKO (submission to knees)
| Shogun 1
| 
| align=center| 1
| align=center| 4:18
| Honolulu, Hawaii, United States
| 
|-
| Win
| align=center| 7–2
| Ressen Messer
| TKO (punches)
| GC 5: Rumble in the Rockies
| 
| align=center| N/A
| align=center| N/A
| Denver, Colorado, United States
| 
|-
| Win
| align=center| 6–2
| Charles Bennett
| TKO (exhaustion)
| KOTC 10: Critical Mass
| 
| align=center| 2
| align=center| 2:38
| San Jacinto, California, United States
| 
|-
| Win
| align=center| 5–2
| Cesar Moreno
| KO (punches)
| GC 4: Collision at Colusa
| 
| align=center| 1
| align=center| 3:58
| Colusa, California, United States
| 
|-
| Loss
| align=center| 4–2
| Eric Payne
| Submission (rear-naked choke)
| ROF 2: Trial By Fire
| 
| align=center| 1
| align=center| 0:35
| Denver, Colorado, United States
| 
|-
| Loss
| align=center| 4–1
| Kelly Dullanty
| Decision (unanimous)
| KOTC 6: Road Warriors
| 
| align=center| 3
| align=center| 5:00
| Mount Pleasant, Michigan, United States
| 
|-
| Win
| align=center| 4–0
| Shad Smith
| TKO (corner stoppage)
| KOTC 4: Gladiators
| 
| align=center| 1
| align=center| 3:08
| San Jacinto, California, United States
| 
|-
| Win
| align=center| 3–0
| Jason Maxwell
| Decision (unanimous)
| KOTC 3: Knockout Nightmare
| 
| align=center| 2
| align=center| 5:00
| San Jacinto, California, United States
| 
|-
| Win
| align=center| 2–0
| Earl Littlepage
| TKO (submission to punches)
| Aspen Slammer
| 
| align=center| N/A
| align=center| N/A
| Aspen, Colorado, United States
| 
|-
| Win
| align=center| 1–0
| David Ibarra
| KO (head kick)
| KOTC 2: Desert Storm
| 
| align=center| 1
| align=center| 4:15
| San Jacinto, California, United States
|

Professional kickboxing record 

|-
|- bgcolor="#c5d2ea"
| 2006-08-12 || Draw ||align=left| Fernando Calleros || K-1 World GP 2006 Las Vegas II || Las Vegas, Nevada, USA || Decision Draw || 3 || 3:00
|-
|- bgcolor="#FFBBBB"
| 2005-08-13 || Loss ||align=left| Remy Bonnel || K-1 World GP 2005 Las Vegas II || Las Vegas, Nevada, USA || Decision (Unanimous) || 3 || 3:00
|-
|- bgcolor="#FFBBBB"
| 2005-07-20 || Loss ||align=left| Ramon Dekkers || K-1 World MAX 2005 Final, Super Fight || Yokohama, Japan || Decision (Unanimous) || 3 || 3:00
|-
|- bgcolor="#FFBBBB"
| 2004-11-06 || Loss ||align=left| Fuji Chalmsak || Titans 1st || Kitakyushu, Japan || KO || 3 || 1:15
|-
|- bgcolor="#CCFFCC"
| 2004-10-13 || Win ||align=left| William Diender || K-1 World MAX 2004 Champions' Challenge || Tokyo, Japan || Ext.R Decision (Unanimous) || 4 || 3:00
|-
|- bgcolor="#CCFFCC"
| 2004-07-07 || Win ||align=left| Serkan Yilmaz || K-1 World MAX 2004 Final, Reserve Fight || Tokyo, Japan || Decision (Unanimous) || 3 || 3:00
|-
|- bgcolor="#FFBBBB"
| 2004-04-07 || Loss ||align=left| John Wayne Parr || K-1 World MAX 2004 Open || Tokyo, Japan || Decision (Unanimous) || 3 || 3:00
|-
! style=background:white colspan=9 |
|-
|- bgcolor="#CCFFCC"
| 2004-01-10 || Win ||align=left| Malaipet Sitprapom || Ring of Fire 11: Bring it On, Douglas County Event Center || Castle Rock, CO || Decision (Unanimous) || 5 || 3:00
|-
! style=background:white colspan=9 |
|-
|- bgcolor="#CCFFCC"
| 2003-11-18 || Win ||align=left| Toshio Matsumoto || K-1 World MAX 2003 Champions' Challenge|| Tokyo, Japan || TKO (Corner Stoppage) || 2 || 2:12
|-
|- bgcolor="#FFBBBB"
| 2003-07-05 || Loss ||align=left| Albert Kraus || K-1 World MAX 2003 Final, Semi Finals || Saitama, Japan || KO (Left Hook) || 3 || 1:33
|-
|- bgcolor="#CCFFCC"
| 2003-07-05 || Win ||align=left| Kozo Takeda || K-1 World MAX 2003 Final, Quarter Finals || Saitama, Japan || KO (Left Hook) || 2 || 0:46
|-
|- bgcolor="#CCFFCC"
| 2002-12-28 || Win ||align=left| Jeremy Harminson || Ring of Fire 6 || Denver, Colorado, USA || TKO (Ref Stop/Punches) || 4 ||
|-
|- bgcolor="#FFBBBB"
| 2002-05-11 || Loss ||align=left| Masato || K-1 World MAX 2002, Quarter Finals || Tokyo, Japan || Decision (Unanimous) || 3 || 3:00
|-
|- bgcolor="#CCFFCC"
| 2002-03-15 || Win ||align=left| Ole Laursen || K-1 World MAX 2002 USA, Final || Denver, Colorado, USA || Ext.R Decision (Unanimous) || 4 || 3:00
|-
! style=background:white colspan=9 |
|-
|- bgcolor="#CCFFCC"
| 2002-03-15 || Win ||align=left| Melvin Murray || K-1 World MAX 2002 USA, Semi Finals || Denver, Colorado, USA || KO (Knee Strikes) || 2 || 1:03
|-
|- bgcolor="#CCFFCC"
| 2001-10-12 || Win ||align=left| George Humbert || Warriors Cup 4 || Culver City, California, USA || Decision (Unanimous) || 5 || 3:00
|-
|- bgcolor="#FFBBBB"
| 2001-05-05 || Loss ||align=left| Alex Gong || K-1 World GP 2001 Preliminary USA || Las Vegas, Nevada, USA || Decision (Split) || 5 || 3:00
|-
! style=background:white colspan=9 |
|-
|- bgcolor="#CCFFCC"
| 2001-03-17 || Win ||align=left| Pedro Villalobos || Marconi Show || Tustin, California, USA || Decision (Unanimous) || 5 || 3:00
|-
|- bgcolor="#CCFFCC"
| 2001-02-25 || Win ||align=left| Brian Popejoy || Warriors Cup 2 || Burbank, California, USA || Decision (Unanimous) || 5 || 3:00
|-
! style=background:white colspan=9 |
|-
|- bgcolor="#CCFFCC"
| 2000-09-09 || Win ||align=left| Doug Evans || Warriors Cup || Irvine, California, USA || || ||
|-
! style=background:white colspan=9 |
|-
|- bgcolor="#CCFFCC"
| 2000-05-13 || Win ||align=left| Steven Berkolyko || Mohegan Sun Casino || Uncasville, Connecticut, USA || TKO (Corner Stoppage) || 3 || 3:00
|-
|- bgcolor="#CCFFCC"
| 2000-03-18 || Win ||align=left| Terrace James || Ring of Fire || Council Bluffs, Iowa, USA || Decision (Unanimous) || 5 || 3:00
|-
|-
| colspan=9 | Legend:

Amateur kickboxing record 

|- bgcolor="#CCFFCC"
| 1999-10-16 || Win ||align=left| Shale Lapage || IKF Iowa || Council Bluffs, Iowa, USA || TKO (Referee Stoppage) || 3 || 1:41
|-
|- bgcolor="#CCFFCC"
| 1999-09-05 || Win ||align=left| Rob Wiley || IKF USA National Amateur Championships, Final || Council Bluffs, Iowa, USA || Decision (Unanimous) || 3 || 3:00
|-
! style=background:white colspan=9 |
|-
|- bgcolor="#CCFFCC"
| 1999-08-21 || Win ||align=left| Terrace James || IKF "The Brawl in Bloomfield" || Bloomfield, Connecticut, USA || Decision (Unanimous) || 5 || 3:00
|-
! style=background:white colspan=9 |
|-
|- bgcolor="#FFBBBB"
| 1999-06-05 || Loss ||align=left| Tony Haddock || IKF Orlando "Rocks the House!!!" || Orlando, Florida, USA || TKO (Referee Stoppage) || 2 || 0:51
|-
! style=background:white colspan=9 |
|-
|- bgcolor="#CCFFCC"
| 1998-11-07 || Win ||align=left| Grigoriy Flitsanov || IKF Iowa || Council Bluffs, Iowa, USA || Decision (Split) || 3 || 3:00
|-
|- bgcolor="#FFBBBB"
| 1998-08-23 || Loss ||align=left| Trevor Desjarlais || IKF Canada || Calgary, Canada || Decision || 3 || 3:00
|-
|-
| colspan=9 | Legend:

References

External links
Official UFC Profile

1978 births
Living people
American male mixed martial artists
Mixed martial artists from Colorado
Lightweight mixed martial artists
Mixed martial artists utilizing Muay Thai
Mixed martial artists utilizing Brazilian jiu-jitsu
American male kickboxers
Kickboxers from Colorado
Welterweight kickboxers
Middleweight kickboxers
American Muay Thai practitioners
American practitioners of Brazilian jiu-jitsu
Sportspeople from Denver
Ultimate Fighting Championship male fighters